The School Curriculum and Standards Authority is the statutory authority of the Government of Western Australia responsible for developing school curriculum and standards in education across Western Australia. The agency superseded the Curriculum Council of Western Australia which was disbanded following a litany of failures in 2012 by the education minister Peter Collier.

The inaugural chair of the Authority is Patrick Garnett.

The Authority is supported by a secretariat of about 148 staff.

References

External links
School Curriculum and Standards Authority
School Curriculum and Standards Authority Act 1997  (PDF file)

2012 in education
Education in Western Australia
Statutory agencies of Western Australia
2012 establishments in Australia
Government agencies established in 2012
Educational organisations based in Australia